Barbara Peden (born 2 August 1907 in Chatswood, New South Wales - died 31 July 1984 in Sydney, New South Wales) was an Australian cricket player. Peden played four test matches for the Australia national women's cricket team. Peden was an architect outside of her cricket career.

References

1907 births
1984 deaths
Australia women Test cricketers